Zhang Xizhe (born 23 January 1991) is a Chinese professional footballer who currently plays for Chinese Super League club Beijing Guoan as an attacking midfielder.

Club career
Zhang Xizhe started his football career with Beijing Guoan when he made his debut for the club on 30 August 2009 in a 1–1 draw against Shandong Luneng. He was then loaned to S.League side Beijing Guoan Talent during the 2010 season. He made his debut and scored his first goal for the club on 12 March 2010 in a 3–1 win against Geylang United. He returned to Beijing in July 2010 and scored his first goal for the club on 22 August 2010 in a 2–2 draw against Henan Jianye. As he grew in experience, he was awarded the Chinese Football Association Young Player of the Year award in the 2012 season. The 2013 season was Zhang's breakout season for Beijing, scoring eleven goals and assisting twelve goals in thirty league games.

On 16 December 2014, Zhang transferred to Bundesliga side VfL Wolfsburg after yet another successful season for Beijing. Zhang made his unofficial debut for Wolfsburg during a winter training camp on 14 January 2015 as he came off the bench to assist Bas Dost's second goal in a 4–1 win against Ajax Cape Town. Even though he made the matchday squad for several matches, Zhang failed to make a single appearance for Wolfsburg during his time with the club.

On 15 July 2015, Zhang returned to Chinese Super League side Beijing Guoan after just six months with VfL Wolfsburg. He made his return debut for the club on 20 July 2015 in a 0–0 draw against Shanghai SIPG. He scored his first goal for the club since his return on 20 September 2015 in a 1–0 win against Jiangsu Sainty. On 25 October 2017, Zhang was sent off during a league match against Chongqing Dangdai Lifan for slapping Chen Lei in the face. On 3 November 2017, he was handed a twelve-match suspension in the league by the Chinese Football Association. After serving his suspension the following season he would win his first Chinese FA Cup with the 2018 Chinese FA Cup against Shandong Luneng Taishan.

International career
Zhang was called up to the Chinese under-20 national team in 2009 and took part in the 2010 AFC U-19 Championship qualifying campaign where he scored two goals from five appearances. At the 2010 AFC U-19 Championship, he played in every game as China lost in the quarter-finals at the tournament. He made his debut for the Chinese national team on 26 March 2011 in a 2–2 draw against Costa Rica. He scored his first goal for China on 6 September 2013 in a 6–1 win against Singapore. On 5 March 2014, Zhang scored a penalty in the final match of 2015 AFC Asian Cup qualification in a 3–1 loss against Iraq which ensured that China advanced to the 2015 AFC Asian Cup as the best third place team, beating Lebanon on goal difference.

Career statistics

Club statistics
As of match played 31 January 2023.

International statistics

International goalsScores and results list China's goal tally first.''

Honours

Club
Beijing Guoan
Chinese Super League: 2009.
Chinese FA Cup: 2018.

VfL Wolfsburg
DFB-Pokal: 2014-15

Individual
Chinese Football Association Young Player of the Year: 2012
Chinese Super League Team of the Year: 2013, 2014
Chinese FA Cup Most Valuable Player: 2018

References

External links
 
 
 Profile on csldata

1991 births
Living people
Footballers from Wuhan
Chinese footballers
China international footballers
Chinese Super League players
Beijing Guoan F.C. players
VfL Wolfsburg players
Singapore Premier League players
Expatriate footballers in Singapore
Chinese expatriate sportspeople in Germany
Expatriate footballers in Germany
Chinese expatriate footballers
Association football midfielders